Mohammed Yahaya Sabato (born 17 February 1988) is a professional footballer who currently plays for Aduana Stars.

Career
The 2007 Toulon Tournament was popular and had international audience. Yahaya shot to limelight springing from his excellent display during the tournament. Shortly after the tournament, he was enrolled and had a successful trial period, with OGC Nice in Ligue 1 and was offered a three-year contract to June 2010 by the Stade Municipal du Ray outfit. On 1 July 2011, Mohammed Yahaya returned to Asante Kotoko to nurture young and promising players and well as foster goodwill in young and coming players in the Ghana Premier League. Up until now, his excellent countenance in football serves a great deal of inspiration to many in the league. On 3 April 2019, Yahaya along with Fatawu Abdulrahman scored a goal each to help Aduana to a 2–1 victory over Eleven Wonders.

International career
As a versatile striker with several years of on-field experience, Yahaya was a crucial player in Ghana's U20 team that participated in the 2007 Toulon Tournament in France. After playing well in his short stint with the Black Satellites, on 7 August 2007, Yahaya was called up by Claude Le Roy for a FIFA International friendly match against Senegal in the New Den Stadium in London, England on 21 August 2007. Hard work and perseverance awarded him a wonderful opportunity yet again in Ghana's national squad that competed at the 2011 African Nations Championship.

Career statistics 
As of matches played on 15 December 2019.

1Includes the Ghanaian FA Cup and the Ghana Super Cup.
2African competitions include the CAF Champions League, CAF Confederations Cup and the CAF Super Cup.
3Other tournaments include the FIFA Club World Cup.

Honours

Club 

Asante Kotoko
 Ghana Premier League: 2011–12, 2012–13
Ghanaian FA Cup runner-up: 2012–13
 Ghana Super Cup: 2011–12, 2012–13

References

External links
Ghana Football Association – official website
Mohammed Yahaya – National Football Teams

1988 births
Living people
Ghanaian footballers
Association football central defenders
Association football midfielders
Tema Youth players
OGC Nice players
Real Tamale United players
Asante Kotoko S.C. players
Ghana Premier League players
2011 African Nations Championship players
Aduana Stars F.C. players
Ghana A' international footballers
2014 African Nations Championship players
Ghanaian expatriate sportspeople in Mexico
Ghanaian expatriate sportspeople in France
Expatriate footballers in Mexico
Ghanaian expatriate footballers
Expatriate footballers in France
Ghanaian expatriate sportspeople in Tanzania
Expatriate footballers in Tanzania